Mount Butak is a stratovolcano in East Java province on Java island, Indonesia. It is a massive volcano, adjacent to Mount Kawi. There are no historical records of its eruptions.

See also 

 List of volcanoes in Indonesia

References 

Stratovolcanoes of Indonesia
Mountains of East Java
Volcanoes of East Java
Holocene stratovolcanoes